Matsugasaki Station may refer to:
 Matsugasaki Station (Kyoto), a subway station on the Karasuma Line
 Matsugasaki Station (Mie), a railway station on the Kintetsu Yamada Line